Trlično is a settlement in the Municipality of Rogatec in eastern Slovenia. It is a dispersed settlement  that stretches along the border with Croatia east of Dobovec pri Rogatcu. The entire Rogatec area traditionally belonged to the Styria region. It is now included in the Savinja Statistical Region.

Mass grave
Trlično is the site of a mass grave from the end of the Second World War. It contains the remains of several dozen Croatians, and perhaps also Banat Swabians, that were killed in May 1945.

References

External links
Trlično on Geopedia

Populated places in the Municipality of Rogatec